John James Thornton (May 22, 1869 – April 26, 1935) was a Major League Baseball pitcher for the Washington Nationals (1889) and   Philadelphia Phillies (1891–1892). He also played outfield for the St. Louis Browns (1892). He continued to play in the minor leagues through 1899. He managed in the minors in 1906.

External links
Baseball Reference

1869 births
Major League Baseball pitchers
Washington Senators (1891–1899) players
Philadelphia Phillies players
St. Louis Browns (NL) players
19th-century baseball players
Milwaukee Brewers (minor league) players
Milwaukee Creams players
Syracuse Stars (minor league baseball) players
Utica Stars players
Mobile Blackbirds players
Norfolk Clam Eaters players
Dallas Steers players
Norfolk Clams players
Norfolk Crows players
Hartford Bluebirds players
New Haven Texas Steers players
Richmond Giants players
Dubuque Tigers players
Newark Colts players
Paterson Giants players
Derby Lushers players
Minor league baseball managers
1935 deaths
Baseball players from Washington, D.C.